The BT Tower is located near Swansea Castle and is the second tallest building in Swansea after The Tower, Meridian Quay. Completed in 1970 by the General Post Office, the BT Group uses it as an office building.

References

Buildings and structures in Swansea
British Telecom buildings and structures
Towers in Wales
Skyscrapers in Wales
Skyscraper office buildings in the United Kingdom
Buildings and structures completed in 1970
Office buildings completed in 1970